Dorthe Dahl-Jensen (born 8 September 1958, Copenhagen, Denmark) is a Danish palaeoclimatology professor and researcher at the Centre for Ice and Climate at the Niels Bohr Institute, University of Copenhagen in Denmark. Her primary field is the study of ice and climate, specifically the reconstruction of climate records from ice cores and borehole data; ice flow models to date ice cores; continuum mechanical properties of anisotropic ice; ice in the solar system; and the history and evolution of the Greenland Ice Sheet.

Education and career

Dahl-Jensen has an M.Sc. In Geophysics (1984) and a Ph.D. in Geophysics (1988) from the University of Copenhagen.

As a student in 1980, Dahl-Jensen took part in ice-core drilling at the Dye 3 site on the Greenland ice sheet, a project led by Willi Dansgaard. Although Dansgaard had a rule that no women were allowed at the drilling site, he allowed Dahl-Jensen to participate. She and her drilling partner Jørgen Peder Steffensen later married.

She was hired by Copenhagen's Niels Bohr Institute as an associate professor in 1997; in 2007, she became head of its Centre for Ice and Climate.

Research

Dahl-Jensen led the North Greenland Eemian Ice Drilling (NEEM) project: a 14-nation research team which spent four years drilling and analysing a  ice core reaching back to the last interglacial period 130–113 thousand years BP, the results of which were published in the journal Nature in 2013. This implies that Antarctic ice melting was a significant factor.

In 2015, a collaborative group of researchers from the U.S., Germany, and Denmark will study Renland, Greenland area for deep ice core drilling. 

Another project in early stages is a deep ice core drilling project, also located in Greenland which is expected to shed light on the northeast Greenland ice stream and its contributions to a rise in sea level. This could give details on what to expect for future sea level rise due to ice sheet mass loss in Greenland. According to The Guardian in 2021:Large-scale melting of the Greenland ice sheet would have long-term global consequences, beyond rising sea levels. It could halt the Gulf Stream ocean current, with potential knock-on effects on the Amazon rainforest and tropical monsoons.

Awards

 EU Descartes Prize (as part of the European Project for Ice Coring in Antarctica (EPICA)) (2008)
 Vega medal from the Swedish Society for Anthropology and Geography (2008)
 Amalienborgprisen (2009)
 Munch prisen (2009)
 Louis Agassiz Medal from the European Geosciences Union (2014) - awarded "for her outstanding scientific contributions in polar glaciology and her leadership in international projects that have extended climate records from Greenland ice cores back into the last interglacial."
 Member of the Royal Danish Academy of Sciences and Letters

References

External links
 Niels Bohr Institute website
 https://www.cresis.ku.edu/content/news/newsletter/840 
 http://www.nature.com/news/greenland-defied-ancient-warming-1.12265
 YouTube interview with Dahl-Jensen

1958 births
Danish women scientists
University of Copenhagen alumni
Scientists from Copenhagen
Academic staff of the University of Copenhagen
Paleoclimatologists
Living people
Members of the Royal Danish Academy of Sciences and Letters
Glaciologists
Women glaciologists
Danish geophysicists
Women geophysicists
Antarctic scientists
Female polar explorers
Danish polar explorers
Women Antarctic scientists
Danish women academics
20th-century Danish scientists
21st-century Danish scientists